Alpas is a group of sports facilities in Kazuno, Akita, Japan. Full-scale alpine, jumping ski, cross-country skiing  and nordic combined competitions can be held in one place.

Kazuno Athletic Stadium
 is a sports venue in Kazuno, Akita, Japan, and was one of home grounds of the Akita FC Cambiare football team. The Athletic Stadium itself includes a 9-lane athletic track and is one of the main tracks in the Akita Prefecture.

Hanawa Ski Jumping Hill
Owned by Kazuno City,  the hill has hosted a number of winter sports events including National Sports Festival of Japan. It is approved by the International Ski Federation. Olympian Ryoyu Kobayashi practiced at this facility as a teenager.

Hanawa Ski Area
The  is the ski resort in Tōhoku region, Japan, operated by City of Kazuno, adjacent to the Towada-Hachimantai National Park.

Courses
All slopes allow skiing, snowboarding, and snowscooting.
Family course for beginners (16°)
Panorama course for intermediate skiers
Giant course for advanced skiers
Cross-country course (10 km)

Facilities
 Arenas
 Training room
 Tennis courts
 Skate board park
 Spa
 Restaurant
 Hotel
 Golf courses
 Meeting rooms
 Ground
 Convention hall
 Aerobics studio/Fitness room

References

External links 
Home page 

Athletics (track and field) venues in Japan
Football venues in Japan
Ski jumping venues in Japan
Multi-purpose stadiums in Japan
Sports venues in Akita Prefecture
Sports venues completed in 1954
Sports venues completed in 1998
Ski areas and resorts in Japan
Kazuno, Akita
1954 establishments in Japan
1998 establishments in Japan